Maksim Chigaev (born 7 November 1996) is a Russian chess player. He was awarded the title Grandmaster by FIDE in 2016.

Together with 43 other Russian chess players, Chigaev signed an open letter to Russian president Vladimir Putin, protesting against the 2022 Russian invasion of Ukraine and expressing solidarity with the  Ukrainian people. 

Chigaev was born in Kemerovo. He played on the Russian team that won the World Youth Under 16 Chess Olympiad in 2012. Chigaev also won an individual gold medal as the best player on the second board. In 2015 he won the Vanya Somov Memorial - World's Youth Stars tournament in Kirishi. In 2018, he played on team Molodezhka of Tyumen which took the bronze medal in both the Russian Team Championships Premier League and the European Club Cup. In January 2019 Chigaev shared second place with Andrey Esipenko and Benjamin Gledura in the Tata Steel Challengers tournament in Wijk aan Zee, the Netherlands scoring 8½ points from 13 games. He competed in the FIDE World Cup 2019 as one of the nominees by the president of FIDE. Chigaev was paired against Parham Maghsoodloo and lost to him by 2–0 and therefore was eliminated from the tournament in the first round.

In October 2020, Chigaev won the Higher League of the 73rd Russian Chess Championship in Sochi with a score of 6.5/9 and qualified for Russian Chess Championship Superfinal later in the year.

References

External links
 
 Maksim Chigaev games at 365Chess.com
 
 Maxim Chigaev team chess record at Olimpbase.org

1996 births
Living people
Chess grandmasters
Russian chess players
People from Kemerovo
Sportspeople from Kemerovo Oblast